Theodor Musachi or Teodor III Muzaka, was an Albanian nobleman who led the 1437–38 revolt against the Ottomans and was one of the founders of the League of Lezhë in 1444.

Family 

Theodor Musachi was а member of the Muzaka family whose domains extended till Kastoria (in modern-day Greece) at the end of the 14th and beginning of the 15th century. According to Gjon Muzaka (not completely reliable primary source) parents of Theodor Corona Musachi had three sons (Gjin, Theodor and Stoya) and two daughters (Comita and Kyranna).

Muzaka explained that Theodor inherited control over Berat from his father Andrea Muzaka III. It is unknown when Muzaka family began to control Berat. Byzantine Eastern Roman sources state that the Muzaka family was in control of Berat regions since 1270 sometimes under Byzantine umbrella and sometimes as de jure independent lords. Many Albanian Princes unlike other ethnicities of the Eastern Roman Empire had the right of total autonomy and self governance in their lands, with the promise to join the Roman emperor in foreign wars. This is also stated in the diary of Teodor Muzaka, in which is mentioned that Muzaka family was the ruler of Epirus for centuries. It does not state clearly if it was historical Epirus or just some parts of Southern Albania. The Muzaka family was in conflict with Prince Marko. Muzaka family managed to defeat Marko and take large shares of south and southwestern Macedonia from him.

Before 1396 (the year of Marko's death) Musachi was probably a young man who participated in this conflict, which explains why he is commemorated in Serbian and south Slavic epic poetry as Korun, Marko's enemy.

At the end of 1411, Niketa Thopia suffered a heavy defeat from the forces of Theodor Corona Musachi during one skirmish. This event was recorded in a Venetian source composed on 29 February 1412. He himself was held prisoner and with the intervention of the Ragusan Republic was released in 1413, but only after conceding some territories around the Shkumbin river to the Muzaka family.

Ottoman invasion
The Ottoman Empire first invaded the principality in 1415, and in 1417 captured the city of Vlorë. Berat was captured that same year following a surprise attack.

Revolt 
In 1437–38, while sanjakbey of the Sanjak of Albania was Theodor's son Yakup Bey, Theodor Korona Muzaka revolted in the region of Berat. This revolt was, like previous Albanian Revolt of 1431–36, suppressed by the Ottomans. Even though in the Albanian Revolt of 1432–36 Gjergj Arianiti was victorious over Ottomans and secured the independence and enlargement of his principality by including today's Bitola. There are claims that Muzaka's 1437—38 revolt is not supported by contemporary sources. Jakub Bey was recorded to be on the position of the sanjakbey of the Sanjak of Albania in 1442.

League of Lezhë 
The League of Lezhë was founded by:

 Lekë Zaharia (lord of Sati and Dagnum) and his vassals Pal Dukagjin and Nicholas Dukagjini 
 Peter Spani (lord of the mountains behind Drivast)
 Lekë Dushmani (lord of Pult)
 George Strez Balšić with Ivan Strez Balšić and Gojko Balšić
 Andrea Thopia and his nephew Tanush
 Gjergj Arianiti
 Theodor Corona Musachi
 Stefan Crnojević (lord of Upper Zeta) and his sons

Notes

Footnotes

References

Sources

Muzaka family
Medieval Albanian nobility
1449 deaths
Year of birth unknown
History of Berat
15th-century Albanian people
Albanian Christians
Eastern Orthodox Christians from Albania